Grégory Tarlé (born 11 April 1983) is a French retired ice hockey player and coach, who coached the French national team at the 2019 IIHF Women's World Championship.

References

External links

1983 births
Living people
French ice hockey coaches
French ice hockey forwards
Sportspeople from Rouen